The Imam Shamil Front is a militant organization in Dagestan led by Gadzhi Makhachev which supports the cause of the Avar ethnic group, competing with the interest of Kumyk movements. The larger Avar movement had split into the Shamyl front and the Union of Avar Jamaat.

References

Organizations based in Dagestan
Caucasian Avar organizations
Islam in Russia